The West Indies women's cricket team toured South Africa in October 2009. They played against South Africa in 4 One Day Internationals and 3 Twenty20 Internationals, losing the ODI series 2–1 but winning the T20I series 3–0.

Squads

Tour Match: Western Province v West Indies

WODI Series

1st ODI

2nd ODI

3rd ODI

4th ODI

WT20I Series

1st T20I

2nd T20I

3rd T20I

References

External links
West Indies Women tour of South Africa 2009/10 from Cricinfo

International cricket competitions in 2009
2009 in women's cricket
Women's international cricket tours of South Africa
West Indies women's cricket team tours